Superman: World of New Krypton is a twelve-issue American comic book limited series produced by DC Comics. It is written by the team of James Robinson and Greg Rucka, who at the time of this publication are the current writers of the Superman and Action Comics titles, and illustrated by artist Pete Woods.

World of New Krypton takes place after the crossover Superman: New Krypton, in which approximately 100,000 Kryptonians and their city of Kandor are saved by Superman from the alien Brainiac and restored to existence. After spending time on Earth, the Kryptonians raise the city into space where they form the planet New Krypton in Earth's solar system. It then leads into Superman: Last Stand of New Krypton.

Publication history
Originally, this series was solicited to be written by Andrew Kreisberg. However, just before the first issue was to be released, Kreisberg dropped out of the title in order to focus on his work as a writer on the television series Fringe, as well as his other comic commitments to Green Arrow/Black Canary. He was promptly replaced by James Robinson and Greg Rucka, who are simultaneously writing Superman and Action Comics, the normal Superman titles, without the regular title character.

For the majority of 2009, this was the only DC Comics title that Superman appeared in. Action Comics and Superman will have new feature characters for the duration of World of New Krypton, with the new incarnation of Nightwing and Flamebird in Action Comics and the Guardian and Mon-El in Superman.

Due to the expansive nature of DC's 2009 summer event Blackest Night, World of New Krypton co-writer Greg Rucka stated, "Superman's on Earth in August". This ended up being foreshadowing for the tie-in mini-series Blackest Night: Superman, which was written by James Robinson and penciled by former Action Comics artist Eddy Barrows. Superman also appears in the main Blackest Night title by Geoff Johns and Ivan Reis in a supporting role, with the main characters in that series being Green Lantern and The Flash.

The events of the series lead into the major War of the Supermen storyline.

Plot

Issue 1
In the build-up to this series, Superman agrees to a deal with his aunt Alura that he renounce his allegiance to Earth and severs ties there in order to live on New Krypton with his people. He does not truthfully renounce all ties to his adopted home, as he tells his wife Lois Lane. He instructs his friend Mon-El to "take over for him" and has conversations with the Guardian and Jimmy Olsen before disembarking for New Krypton. Superman intends to live amongst the Kryptonians in the hopes of easing tensions with Earth and teaching them to use their powers responsibly.

When he arrives on the planet, he receives a lukewarm welcome from members of the Kryptonian military. He is openly welcomed by Alura, who asks him to pick a guild with which to be employed while on the planet. While he is deciding this, it is revealed to him that General Zod has been released from the Phantom Zone and is lauded as a great leader and a hero. He is given his previous job as the head of the Kryptonian military, and Superman finds this alarming. Zod maintains that he no longer has any reason to hate his fellow Kryptonians, as they have now accepted him. While deciding which guild to register for and having an argument with Zod, he is assaulted by his father Jor-El's former friend and lobotomized disciple of Zod, Non. Superman disposes of him quickly, and makes it clear that while the New Kryptonians hostile to him are steadily learning their powers, Superman has had his for years and demonstrates his vastly superior fighting skill and capability with his powers.

When Alura asks Superman which guild he has chosen, he admits that he is not comfortable with any, even going so far as to liken the Kryptonians' working conditions to slavery. However, Superman ultimately is assigned to be a member of the Military guild and is referred to by General Zod as "Commander El".

Issue 2
On Oa, the Guardians of the Universe discuss New Krypton, fearing that the Kryptonians while under the leadership of General Zod will return to a military expansion that the Guardians feared long ago before Krypton's destruction. On New Krypton, Zod boasts of a recently redesigned rifle made to kill native Kryptonian species. He puts "Commander El" in charge of the "Red Shard", a unit responsible for law enforcement and civic defense.

As his second, Superman is assigned Lieutenant Asha Del-Nar. Together, they find members of their new unit forcing Non, a recent transfer into the unit, to fight against a vicious Torquat. Superman reprimands the unit and later shares a conversation with Alura about the Kryptonian guilds. Avoiding Zod, Superman runs into his servant of the labor guild who speaks of unrest in his guild. Zod then arrives and orders Superman to kill a stampede of beasts that threatens a colony.

When the Red Shard prepares to kill the animals with their new rifles, Superman orders them to put the weapons away and instead teaches them how to wrangle the beasts without killing them. Zod compliments Superman on handling the situation, but admonishes "Commander El" for challenging his authority. Their conversation is stopped when news of a Labor Guild member taking hostages, including Alura, emerges. Commander Gor, a man responsible for killing several human police officers in Superman: New Krypton, arrives and threatens to kill them all if the hostages are not released. This leaves Zod pleased and Superman concerned that there could be a loss of life on his watch.

Issue 3
Superman tries to talk General Zod out of allowing Commander Gor to execute the Labor Guild prisoners. Zod is undeterred, but Superman convinces him to allow him to try to quell the situation without further violence. As a sign of good faith, Superman allows himself to be blasted with the red solar energy of an Archer rifle, which negates his powers for thirty minutes. Superman goes into the Galla where Labor Guild leader, Tam-Or, is keeping the provisional government captive. He appeals to his aunt, Alura, and asks her to consider the Guild's needs should they agree to set them free. Alura allows Tam-Or to air his demands.

Tam-Or says that as Earth's sun precludes the need for rest or food, the Labor Guild has been working literally non-stop since New Krypton has been formed. They want time to rest and see their families. Additionally, there is some unknown disease spreading through the Labor Guild ranks, even though that shouldn't be possible, and they want the Science Guild to find out why. Finally, they want a representation on the new Science Council being formed. Alura agrees to the first two requests, but points out that the Labor Guild has never had a seat on the Science Council in Kryptonian history, to which Superman points out that this is New Krypton. Alura finally agrees to consider the third demand if the Labor Guild agree to stand down.

The Labor Guild surrenders and sets down their weapons. Superman has resolved the situation peacefully before General Zod's deadline. Commander Gor however, sits with a sniper rifle above the square where Alura and the others were being held. Ignoring a direct order from Zod not to attack unless Superman is unable to reach a peaceful resolution, Gor fires a shot aimed at Tam-Or, but Supergirl rushes in and catches the bullet before it can strike its target.

Superman returns to Military Guild headquarters and gives Zod an update. Commander Gor, having nursed a dislike for Superman for quite some time, kicks him in the back. By Guild protocol, an official duel is conducted. Since both men have super powers, Superman relies upon his combat training to win the day. As the fight concludes, Superman turns his eyes upward to see three members of the Green Lantern Corps hovering above them. Green Lantern Hal Jordan tells Superman: "It's time we talked".

Issue 4
Based on the recent arrival of New Krypton, the Guardians of the Universe have sent a fact-finding mission. Their first contact, Kal-El, is pleased to see his old friends, but General Zod arrives within seconds. He remembers the Earthly Green Lanterns that fought him skilfully when they last met, and he orders Kal and Tyr to give them a tour of New Krypton.

Flying over the city, Tyr-Van gives the Green Lanterns a rundown of the city's founding, before moving on to encompass the whole planet - using the tech they were able to steal from Brainiac, they have made a new planet. Currently they are building an atmosphere, then a moon. Within a year, they will be finished. Kal is proud and happy. He and Sodam Yat chat briefly about Mon-El.

Lieutenant Nar arrives to get Kal for an emergency briefing. Thirteen criminals were brought to New Krypton from the Phantom Zone, and adapted to their powers faster than the other Kryptonians. They have been on the run, but they have a lead on one of them. Orders are to bring them in, but the Red Shard has been ordered to escort the Green Lanterns on their tour.

The Green Lanterns are surprised, and a little unsympathetic, to find that New Krypton is building a fleet of space ships. Tyr tells them that they are billed as a security deterrent, but Hal Jordan believes Zod is planning something. Kal cannot vouch for Zod, but he asks Hal to trust him.

Suddenly, an explosion occurs at the other end of the yard. A group of the criminals were meeting here, and when they were ambushed by the Military Guild, one of them ruptured a fuel line to cover the escape of all the others. There were no deaths, and no apparent leads. But Kal points out that the Kryptonians can hear someone flying away very fast. The chase is on.

The fugitive is identified as Val-Ty, alias Greyline, a notorious murderer who fought Tomar-Re. They chase him into the scaffolding around one of the unfinished ships, where he steals welding equipment and uses it as an explosive. Nar takes the Red Shard around the other side and Kal and the Green Lanterns are to herd him there. However, Zod has his own plans - when Nar has him in custody, she is to execute him. Kal overhears her from the other side of the scaffolding, and asks her to ignore Zod's last order.

The plan is a success, and Greyline is taken into custody. The Green Lanterns prepare to take him back to Oa to be imprisoned for past crimes, but Zod arrives and points out that New Krypton has jurisdiction - and Oa has no extradition treaties with New Krypton. Hal is set to argue, but John Stewart gets him to back off on the condition that Zod not execute Greyline, and the Green Lanterns go home to make their report.

That night, Greyline is behind a force field, already swearing revenge on Kal (who is surprised to see Zod kept his word) and the rest of the Military Guild. Zod is impressed at his skill, but he orders Kal and Nar to be taken into custody and charged with treason.

Issue 5
Imprisoned by General Zod for treason, Kal is visited by Dyn-Xe of the Artists Guild, who was appointed as his defence counsel for his trial.

Dyn-Xe informed Kal that if found guilty of treason, the penalty is death by execution in the absence of the phantom zone for incarceration. Due to the Nova Day Celebration, all pending legal matters must also be resolved before the end of the holiday or the day after tomorrow.

Dyn-Xe's defence strategy is to argue that because Zod has a history with the house of EL, prosecuting Kal is just another vendetta against the house of EL.

At the trial, Zod withdrew himself from prosecuting Kal but continued to prosecute Lieutenant Nar. She admitted to all charges and claimed she acted alone. However Kal argued for her and eventually inform the council that he stopped Nar from obeying Zod's order. Zod dismissed all charges against Nar but ask the council to find Kal guilty of treason by his own admission.

Nar and Tyr-Van visited Kal at his cell and Tyr-Van installed a device to deactivate the red sun generator in his cell, which would allow him to escape. However, Kal does not escape and choose to accept his punishment.

Kal was found guilty by the council and denies that by disobeying Zod's order, he was a traitor. Zod spoke up for Kal by pointing out that on Nova day, the religious guild has the power to grant absolution. Kal was eventually spared and freed.

As part of the Nova Day celebration, New Krypton planned to remove the dome covering their city with the successful regulation of the atmosphere. At the height of the celebration, Zod was shot by an assassin.

Issue 6
The assassin, Ral-Dar was captured by Kal, Kara and his team and interrogated. Ral-Dar revealed that his attempted assassination on Zod was done to save New Krypton.

Zod's injury was serious and the doctor has to put him in a stasis to prevent a cascading failure. The people of New Krypton were afraid that the attempted assassination of Zod is the start of an attack. Alura managed to calm the people down.

Kal headed back to interrogate Ral-Dar and discovered he managed to escape, apparently with some outside help was seen leaving for Earth.

Fearing an escalation of tension between Earth and New Krytpon, Kal decide to capture Ral-Dar with Kara.

Issue 7
While Superman returns to New Krypton with Ral-Dar's body, an Interim Ruling Council session revealed that the weapon used in the assassination attempt on Zod was Earth-made, leading to the conclusion that there were traitors amongst the Kryptonians. Zod turned up at the meeting and appointed Kal-El as General and Commander of the New Krypton armies.

Kal figured out that Tyr-Van was working for Zod and was instructed by Zod to allow Kal to escape when he was imprisoned for treason.

New Krypton is carrying out Operation: Callisto, a plan to disengage one of Jupiter's moon to act as New Krypton's moon. The plan was going as planned until they encountered a Thanagarian's battle group. When the pilot ship guiding Callisto was destroyed, the explosion affected the sunstone crystal inserted into Callisto's core and it is now out of control and heading for New Krypton.

Issue 8
The Thanagarian's battle group, led by Wing-Master Vetalla Dae's gyrfalcon was engaging the Kryptonian when it suffered a catastrophic hit. Kal, Nar and a few other Kryptonian beached the ship and managed to save the ship.

Kal explained that New Krypton bears no hostility towards Thanagar and that he has ordered all Kryptonian forces withdrawn and asked to attend to the more urgent task of the out-of-control Callisto.

The Thanagarian assisted in the slowing down of Callisto by firing nth metal energy beams and hitting Callisto with targeted gravity wells, but it remained on a collision course with New Krypton. Kal managed to get all the people of New Krypton to nudge Callisto to its intended orbit.

Wing-Master Dae was directed by her government to open diplomatic channels between New Krypton and Thanagar. The Interim Council agrees but the session was interrupted by another alien named Jemm.

Issue 9
Jemm from Saturn started a fight in the council but eventually agreed to stop the fight and address the council. He chided the Kryptonian for their arrogance and feeling of entitlement and warned that they will be watching.

The Labour Guild is having an epidemic with those working the farm details being infected with shakes.

Kal was visiting Zod who is making a slow recovery, when they received word that there was something wrong at councillor Mar-Li's residence. Kal forced open the door to see Adam Strange standing over the body of the councillor.

Issue 10
Adam Strange explained to the Interim Council that he was not responsible for the councillor's death as the operation of the Zeta Beam is not a precise transportation instrument. He also revealed that he comes to New Krypton to deliver a formal protest due to their establishment of diplomatic accord with Thanagar.

Kal convince the council to allow Adam Strange to leave if he can prove his innocence by solving the murder of Councillor Mar-Li.

An examination of the room revealed that the killer has not left any presence behind. An examination of his body revealed traces of carbon casing for small explosive rounds, fired from a device used to help with terraforming. It was a tool used by the Labour Guild and Mar-Li was vocal opponent of admitting a labour guild member into the council.

Kal and Adam proceed to the Labour Guild to talk to Tam-Or, their unofficial spokesman where they came across another sick Labour guild member. Tam-Or run away from Kal with the help of the Labour Guild members. Adam pursued Tam-Or but he managed to escape.

Kal and Adam revealed their findings while Lieutenant Nar requested for permission to switch to orbital scanners as they have not being able to find Tam-Or. Kal is convinced that Tam-Or is not guilty as he wanted representation for the Labour Guild. Kal's postulated that killing councillor Mar-Li may be an assassination attempt. Kal's aunt Alura, another council member is seen targeted in a sniper's scope.

Issue 11
As Alura discussed with her assistant, Lyra on the councillor's death and the rite of selection for a new council member, Lyra was shot. After escorting Alura to safety, Kal's team managed to recover the weapon that shot Lyra, but the ease at which the weapon was discovered aroused Adam's suspicion, There was genetic residues left on the rifle that matches Tam-Or, which suggested that he was the shooter that made an attempt on Alura's life.

Kal reported his findings to the council and it was suggested that Kal was not seriously pursuing Tam-Or because his mother was also from the Labour Guild.

Kal visited Zod who told him that it is not difficult with Kryptonian technology for genetic material to be planted. He concluded that Tam-Or is smart but not a tactician and could not be responsible for Mar-Ali's death or the attempt on Alura's life.

Kal and Adam met Tyr-Van and convinced him to lead them to a military facility lined with lead and soundproofed. They found Tam-Or and persuaded him to surrender. Councillor Zo and Commander Gor tracked Kal as there was some question about his loyalty. Kal was informed that Zod had resumed active duty and that he had been demoted back to Commander. Kal, Tyr and Tam were hit with the Red Sun beam while Gor gave the command to fire the kinetics.

Issue 12
Adam managed to Zeta all of them out and back but he was not fast enough to stop Tam-Or from being hit by the kinetic bullets.

Gor, Zo and Zod turned up at their location and Zod demoted Gor to Lancepsade for not following his orders of no lethal force. Zod request Adam Strange's departure due to his sensitive position as a representative of Rann.

Kal told Zod that Tam was being manipulated and knew who was responsible but died before he could tell them.

Kal and Zod revealed the facts of the case and Kal concluded that Ral-Dar and Tam-Or were probably misled. Kal eventually figured that Councillor Wri-Qin was the mastermind. Kal visited Wri-Qin who revealed that Superwoman came on General Lane's behalf and convinced them to weaken Krypton, so that Earth can achieve a quicker victory against Krypton.

It was Wri-Qin that had his co-conspirators killed so that he could have all the spoils to himself. Kal and his Red Shard team managed to capture Wri-Qin into custody.

Zod informed Kal that the council has granted the Labour Guild a seat on the council and that Tyr-Van has been named his representative. As Kal-El contemplated his contributions to Krypton, Zod commended him for being instrumental in changing the foundation of society. As they conversed, a Brainiac robot suddenly appears.

Collected editions
Superman: New Krypton Vol. 3 (144 pages, Collecting World of New Krypton #1-5)
Superman: Codename Patriot (144 pages, Collecting Superman's Pal Jimmy Olsen Special #2, Superman #691, Supergirl #44, Action Comics #880, Superman: World of New Krypton #6)
Superman: New Krypton Vol. 4 (192 pages, Collecting World of New Krypton #6-12)

Notes

References

2009 comics debuts
Crossover comics
Comics by Greg Rucka
Counter-Earths
Colonialism in popular culture